Joseph Peter Vachon (23 January 1887 – 31 December 1961) was a retired United States Army brigadier general. During World War II, he commanded the 101st Division during the Philippines campaign and then spent more than three years as a prisoner of war after being ordered to surrender in May 1942.

Early life and education
Vachon was raised in Westbrook, Maine, where he graduated from Westbrook High School in 1904. He later graduated from the Army Infantry School advanced course in 1928 and the Command and General Staff School in 1929.

Military career
Vachon enlisted in the Coast Artillery Corps in November 1904. He served until November 1907, advancing from private to sergeant. Vachon reenlisted in the Coast Artillery Corps in June 1908, again advancing from private to sergeant. In February 1912, he was commissioned as a second lieutenant in the Philippine Scouts.

In November 1916, Vachon was transferred to the Regular Army infantry and promoted to first lieutenant. He was promoted to captain in May 1917, major in July 1920 and lieutenant colonel in August 1935.

In October 1940, Vachon received a temporary promotion to colonel which was made permanent in May 1941. He assumed command of the 101st Division and then received a temporary promotion to brigadier general in December 1941. His division was assigned to help defend Mindanao during the Japanese invasion of the Philippines. Vachon was imprisoned on Formosa and in Manchuria after capture.

After the war, Vachon retired from active duty as a brigadier general on 31 August 1946.

Later life
Vachon died in San Francisco, California and was interred at San Francisco National Cemetery.

References

1887 births
1961 deaths
People from Westbrook, Maine
United States Army soldiers
Military personnel from Maine
United States Army personnel of World War I
United States Army Command and General Staff College alumni
United States Army generals of World War II
Recipients of the Silver Star
American prisoners of war in World War II
Recipients of the Distinguished Service Medal (US Army)
United States Army generals
Burials at San Francisco National Cemetery
United States Army Coast Artillery Corps personnel